Cadenas is a Spanish surname. It is the surname of:

 Manolo Cadenas (born 1955), Spanish handball coach
 Margarita Cadenas, Venezuelan-French director, producer and screenwriter
 Rafael Cadenas (born 1930), Venezuelan poet and essayist

See also
 Cadena, another surname
 Cárdenas 
 cadena nacional, a type of broadcast in Latin America